An overture is the instrumental introduction to a dramatic, choral or, occasionally, instrumental composition.

Overture may also refer to:

Companies
Overture Networks, multi-national manufacturer of networking and telecommunications equipment
Overture Films theatrical motion picture production & distribution company
Overture Services, an Internet search engine company acquired by Yahoo! in 2003

Films
Overture (1958 film), a 1958 Canadian documentary film
Overture (1965 film), a 1965 Hungarian documentary film
The Overture, a 2004 Thai musical-drama film

Music
"Overture" (Def Leppard song), the last track on Def Leppard's debut album On Through The Night (1980) 
"Overture" (The Who song), a song by The Who from the 1969 rock opera Tommy
"Overture", a song from Irving Berlin's musical Annie Get Your Gun, starring Dolores Gray as Annie Oakley
"Overture", a song from Patrick Wolf's album The Magic Position (2007)
"Overture", the instrumental introduction of Rush's song "2112" from the album of the same name, released in 1976
"Overture 1928", the second track from Dream Theater's fifth studio album, Metropolis Pt. 2: Scenes From A Memory
"Overture" (Bruckner), an orchestral composition by Anton Bruckner
"Overture", a 2015 song by AJR on their album Living Room
"Overture", a 2017 song by AJR on their album The Click
”Overture”, a 2010 song by Martin O’Donnell on the soundtrack of Halo: Reach

Other uses
Overture (novel), a 2018 novel by Zlatko Topčić
Overture (video game), a 2015 action-adventure game
Overture Center, a performing arts center and art gallery in Madison, Wisconsin
Penumbra: Overture, a survival horror PC video game, the first installment of the Penumbra series by Frictional Games
Overture (software), notation software developed by Sonic Scores
Boom Overture, a supersonic jet airliner expected to be introduced around 2029

See also

 
 Ouverture (disambiguation)
 Toussaint Louverture (disambiguation)